Notable people with the surname Gault are:

In politics
 Andrew Hamilton Gault (1882–1958), Canadian army officer and MP in the UK parliament
 Daniel Gault (1842–1912), Oregon politician
 Matthew Hamilton Gault (1822–1887), Canadian politician

In sport
 David Gault (born 1976), Australian footballer
 Don Gault (born 1946), American football player
 Ernie Gault (1889–1980), English footballer
 Georges Gault, French tennis player
 Michael Gault (born 1983), Northern Ireland football player
 Mick Gault, English competitive shooter
 Willie Gault (born 1960), American football player

In other fields
 Alma Elizabeth Gault (1891–1981), American nursing administrator
 Annabel Gault (born 1952), British artist
 Andrew Frederick Gault (1833–1903), Ulster-born Canadian merchant, industrialist, and philanthropist 
 Henri Gault (1929–2000), co-founder of Gault Millau restaurant guides
 Sir James Frederick Gault (1902–1977), British brigadier and military assistant to General Dwight Eisenhower
 John Gault, American entrepreneur and inventor
 Steven Gault, Canadian biker and police informer
 Stanley Gault (born 1926), CEO of Rubbermaid
 Thomas Gault (1938–2015), New Zealand judge
 William Campbell Gault (1910–1995), American novelist

Fictional people
 Lucy Gault, principal character in William Trevor's novel The Story of Lucy Gault
 Captain Gault, an English sea captain in stories by William Hope Hodgson
 Captain Gault, one of the Characters of Lost

Scottish surnames